Nawaka (national water camp) is a National Jamboree for Sea Scouts in The Netherlands. It is organised every four years by Scouting Nederland. Around 5000 scouts, approximately 100 coming outside of the Netherlands, in the age of 7 to 21 years join this event bringing together about 1000 ships and sailboats.

History

JubJam100 
In 2010 the JubJam100 (Jubilee Jamboree 100) was held from 26 July to 4 August 2010 on the Nawaka-campsite as a camp for "Land", Sea and Air Scouts.

External links
Nawaka

Nawaka
Scouting jamborees